Omar Bruno De Marchi (born 28 May 1966) is an Argentine lawyer and politician, currently serving as National Deputy elected in Mendoza Province since 2019.

De Marchi previously served as intendente (mayor) of Luján de Cuyo on two occasions, from 2015 to 2019 and from 1999 to 2005. He is the leader of PRO in Mendoza and first vice president of the Chamber of Deputies.

Early life and career
De Marchi was born on 28 May 1966 in Luján de Cuyo, Mendoza Province. He studied law at the National University of Córdoba, graduating in 1991, and has a master's degree on Business Administration from Universidad Francisco de Vitoria. He is married and has two children.

Political career
De Marchi was originally a member of the Democratic Party of Mendoza. He was elected to the mayoralty of his hometown in 1993, and served two terms until 2005. In 2005, De Marchi was elected to the Argentine Chamber of Deputies on the PD–Recreate for Growth list. He was re-elected in 2009, this time as part of the PRO Union alliance, a precursor of Republican Proposal.

In 2015, De Marchi was elected once again as mayor of Luján de Cuyo.

In 2019, De Marchi ran for a seat in the Argentine Chamber of Deputies as the third candidate in the Cambia Mendoza list; the list received 52.44% of the vote and De Marchi was elected. In 2020, De Marchi was elected First Vice President of the Chamber of Deputies.

References

External links
Profile on the official website of the Chamber of Deputies (in Spanish)

Living people
1966 births
People from Mendoza Province
Members of the Argentine Chamber of Deputies elected in Mendoza
Mayors of places in Argentina
Republican Proposal politicians
National University of Córdoba alumni
20th-century Argentine politicians
21st-century Argentine politicians
Argentine lawyers